Robinson Crusoe is a novel by Daniel Defoe, first published on 25 April 1719. The first edition credited the work's protagonist Robinson Crusoe as its author, leading many readers to believe he was a real person and the book a travelogue of true incidents.

Epistolary, confessional, and didactic in form, the book is presented as an autobiography of the title character (whose birth name is Robinson Kreutznaer) – a castaway who spends 28 years on a remote tropical desert island near the coasts of Venezuela and Trinidad, roughly resembling Tobago, encountering cannibals, captives, and mutineers before being rescued. The story has been thought to be based on the life of Alexander Selkirk, a Scottish castaway who lived for four years on a Pacific island called "Más a Tierra" (now part of Chile) which was renamed Robinson Crusoe Island in 1966.

Despite its simple narrative style, Robinson Crusoe was well received in the literary world and is often credited as marking the beginning of realistic fiction as a literary genre. It is generally seen as a contender for the first English novel. Before the end of 1719, the book had already run through four editions, and it has gone on to become one of the most widely published books in history, spawning so many imitations, not only in literature but also in film, television, and radio, that its name is used to define a genre, the Robinsonade.

Plot summary

Robinson Crusoe (the family name corrupted from the German name "Kreutznaer") sets sail from Kingston upon Hull on a sea voyage in August 1651, against the wishes of his parents, who wanted him to pursue a career in law. After a tumultuous journey where his ship is wrecked in a storm, his desire for the sea remains so strong that he sets out to sea again. This journey, too, ends in disaster, as the ship is taken over by Salé pirates (the Salé Rovers) and Crusoe is enslaved by a Moor. Two years later, he escapes in a boat with a boy named Xury; a captain of a Portuguese ship off the west coast of Africa rescues him. The ship is en route to Brazil. Crusoe sells Xury to the captain. With the captain's help, Crusoe procures a plantation in Brazil.

Years later, Crusoe joins an expedition to purchase slaves from Africa but is shipwrecked in a storm about forty miles out to sea on an island off the Venezuelan coast (which he calls the Island of Despair) near the mouth of the Orinoco River on 30 September 1659. He observes the latitude as 9 degrees and 22 minutes north. He sees penguins and seals on this island. Only he, the captain's dog, and two cats survive the shipwreck. Overcoming his despair, he fetches arms, tools and other supplies from the ship before it breaks apart and sinks. He builds a fenced-in habitat near a cave which he excavates. By making marks in a wooden cross, he creates a calendar. By using tools salvaged from the ship, and some which he makes himself, he hunts, grows barley and rice, dries grapes to make raisins, learns to make pottery and raises goats. He also adopts a small parrot. He reads the Bible and becomes religious, thanking God for his fate in which nothing is missing but human society.

More years pass and Crusoe discovers cannibals, who occasionally visit the island to kill and eat prisoners. He plans to kill them for committing an abomination, but later realizes he has no right to do so, as the cannibals do not knowingly commit a crime. He dreams of obtaining one or two servants by freeing some prisoners; when a prisoner escapes, Crusoe helps him, naming his new companion "Friday" after the day of the week he appeared. Crusoe teaches Friday the English language and converts him to Christianity.

After more cannibals arrive to partake in a feast, Crusoe and Friday kill most of them and save two prisoners. One is Friday's father and the other is a Spaniard, who informs Crusoe about other Spaniards shipwrecked on the mainland. A plan is devised wherein the Spaniard would return to the mainland with Friday's father and bring back the others, build a ship, and sail to a Spanish port.

Before the Spaniards return, an English ship appears; mutineers have commandeered the vessel and intend to maroon their captain on the island. Crusoe and the ship's captain strike a deal in which Crusoe helps the captain and the loyal sailors retake the ship. With their ringleader executed by the captain, the mutineers take up Crusoe's offer to be marooned on the island rather than being returned to England as prisoners to be hanged. Before embarking for England, Crusoe shows the mutineers how he survived on the island and states that there will be more men coming.

Crusoe leaves the island on 19 December 1686 and arrives in England on 11 June 1687. He learns that his family believed him dead; as a result, he was left nothing in his father's will. Crusoe departs for Lisbon to reclaim the profits of his estate in Brazil, which has granted him much wealth. In conclusion, he transports his wealth overland to England from Portugal to avoid travelling by sea. Friday accompanies him and, en route, they endure one last adventure together as they fight off famished wolves while crossing the Pyrenees.

Characters
 Robinson Crusoe: The narrator of the novel who gets shipwrecked.
 Friday: A native Caribbean who Crusoe saves from cannibalism, and subsequently named "Friday." He becomes a servant and friend to Crusoe.
 Xury: Servant to Crusoe after they escape slavery from the Captain of the Rover together. He is later given to the Portuguese Sea Captain as an indentured servant.
 The Widow: Friend to Crusoe who looks over his assets while he is away.
 Portuguese Sea Captain: Rescues Crusoe after he escapes from slavery. Later helps him with his money and plantation.
 The Spaniard: A man rescued by Crusoe and Friday from the cannibals who later helps them escape the island. 
 Friday's father: rescued by Crusoe and Friday at the same time as the Spaniard.

 Robinson Crusoe's father: A merchant named Kreutznaer.
 Captain of the Rover: Moorish pirate of Sallee who captures and enslaves Crusoe.
 Traitorous crew members: members of a mutinied ship who appear towards the end of novel
 The Savages: Cannibals that come to Crusoe's Island and who represent a threat to Crusoe's religious and moral convictions as well as his own safety.

Religion
Robinson Crusoe was published in 1719 during the Enlightenment period of the 18th century. In the novel, Crusoe sheds light on different aspects of Christianity and his beliefs. The book can be considered a spiritual autobiography as Crusoe's views on religion change dramatically from the start of his story to the end.

At the beginning of the book, Crusoe is concerned with sailing away from home, whereupon he meets violent storms at sea. He promises to God that, if he survived that storm, he would be a dutiful Christian man and head home according to his parents' wishes. However, when Crusoe survives the storm, he decides to keep sailing and notes that he could not fulfill the promises he had made during his turmoil.

After Robinson is shipwrecked on his island, he begins to suffer from extreme isolation. He turns to his animals, such as his parrot, to talk to but misses human contact. He turns to God during his time of turmoil in search of solace and guidance. He retrieves a Bible from a ship that was washed along the shore and begins to memorize verses. In times of trouble, he would open the Bible to a random page and read a verse that he believed God had made him open and read, and that would ease his mind. Therefore, during the time in which Crusoe was shipwrecked, he became very religious and often would turn to God for help.

When Crusoe meets his servant Friday, he begins to teach him scripture and about Christianity. He tries to teach Friday to the best of his ability about God and what Heaven and Hell are. His purpose is to convert Friday into being a Christian and to his values and beliefs. "During a long time that Friday has now been with me, and that he began to speak to me, and understand me, I was not wanting to lay a foundation of religious knowledge in his mind; particularly I asked him one time who made him?"

Lynne W. Hinojosa has argued that throughout the novel Crusoe interprets scripture in a way that "[s]cripture never has ramifications beyond his own needs and situations" (651). For Hinojosa, Crusoe places a biblical narrative inside himself unlike earlier interpretations of scripture in which the individual was subsumed by the biblical narrative. For this reason, Hinojosa contends that "Crusoe displays no desire… to carry out the mission of the church or to be reunited with society in order to participate in God's plan for human history" (652).

Sources and real-life castaways 

There were many stories of real-life castaways in Defoe's time. Most famously, Defoe's suspected inspiration for Robinson Crusoe is thought to be Scottish sailor Alexander Selkirk, who spent four years on the uninhabited island of Más a Tierra (renamed Robinson Crusoe Island in 1966) in the Juan Fernández Islands off the Chilean coast. Selkirk was rescued in 1709 by Woodes Rogers during an English expedition that led to the publication of Selkirk's adventures in both A Voyage to the South Sea, and Round the World and A Cruising Voyage Around the World in 1712. According to Tim Severin, "Daniel Defoe, a secretive man, neither confirmed nor denied that Selkirk was the model for the hero of his book. Apparently written in six months or less, Robinson Crusoe was a publishing phenomenon."

According to Andrew Lambert, author of Crusoe's Island, it is a "false premise" to suppose that Defoe's novel was inspired by the experiences of a single person such as Selkirk, because the story is "a complex compound of all the other buccaneer survival stories." However, Robinson Crusoe is far from a copy of Rogers' account: Becky Little argues three events that distinguish the two stories:
 Robinson Crusoe was shipwrecked while Selkirk decided to leave his ship thus marooning himself;
 The island Crusoe was shipwrecked on had already been inhabited, unlike the solitary nature of Selkirk's adventures.
 The last and most crucial difference between the two stories is Selkirk was a privateer, looting and raiding coastal cities during the War of Spanish Succession.
"The economic and dynamic thrust of the book is completely alien to what the buccaneers are doing," Lambert says. "The buccaneers just want to capture some loot and come home and drink it all, and Crusoe isn’t doing that at all. He's an economic imperialist: He's creating a world of trade and profit."

Other possible sources for the narrative include Ibn Tufail's Hayy ibn Yaqdhan, and Spanish sixteenth-century sailor Pedro Serrano. Ibn Tufail's Hayy ibn Yaqdhan is a twelfth-century philosophical novel also set on a desert island, and translated from Arabic into Latin and English a number of times in the half-century preceding Defoe's novel.

Pedro Luis Serrano was supposed to be a Spanish sailor who was marooned for seven or eight years on a small desert island after shipwrecking in the 1520s on a small island in the Caribbean off the coast of Nicaragua. He had no access to fresh water and lived off the blood and flesh of sea turtles and birds. He was quite a celebrity when he returned to Europe; before passing away, he recorded the hardships suffered in documents that show the endless anguish and suffering, the product of absolute abandonment to his fate, now held in the General Archive of the Indies, in Seville. There is some doubt of the historicity of the tale; nonetheless it is possible that Defoe heard his story in one of his visits to Spain before becoming a writer.

Yet another source for Defoe's novel may have been the Robert Knox account of his abduction by the King of Ceylon Rajasinha II of Kandy in 1659 in An Historical Relation of the Island Ceylon.

Severin (2002) unravels a much wider range of potential sources of inspiration, and concludes by identifying castaway surgeon Henry Pitman as the most likely:

An employee of the Duke of Monmouth, Pitman played a part in the Monmouth Rebellion. His short book about his desperate escape from a Caribbean penal colony, followed by his shipwrecking and subsequent desert island misadventures, was published by John Taylor of Paternoster Row, London, whose son William Taylor later published Defoe's novel.

Severin argues that since Pitman appears to have lived in the lodgings above the father's publishing house and that Defoe himself was a mercer in the area at the time, Defoe may have met Pitman in person and learned of his experiences first-hand, or possibly through submission of a draft. Severin also discusses another publicized case of a marooned man named only as Will, of the Miskito people of Central America, who may have led to the depiction of Friday.

Secord (1963) analyses the composition of Robinson Crusoe and gives a list of possible sources of the story, rejecting the common theory that the story of Selkirk is Defoe's only source.

Reception and sequels

The book was published on 25 April 1719. Before the end of the year, this first volume had run through four editions.

By the end of the nineteenth century, no book in the history of Western literature had more editions, spin-offs, and translations (even into languages such as Inuktitut, Coptic, and Maltese) than Robinson Crusoe, with more than 700 such alternative versions, including children's versions with pictures and no text.

The term "Robinsonade" was coined to describe the genre of stories similar to Robinson Crusoe.

Defoe went on to write a lesser-known sequel, The Farther Adventures of Robinson Crusoe (1719). It was intended to be the last part of his stories, according to the original title page of the sequel's first edition, but a third book was published (1720) Serious Reflections During the Life and Surprising Adventures of Robinson Crusoe: With his Vision of the Angelick World.

Interpretations of the novel 

The novel has been subject to numerous analyses and interpretations since its publication. In a sense, Crusoe attempts to replicate his society on the island. This is achieved through the use of European technology, agriculture and even a rudimentary political hierarchy. Several times in the novel Crusoe refers to himself as the "king" of the island, whilst the captain describes him as the "governor" to the mutineers. At the very end of the novel the island is referred to as a "colony". The idealized master-servant relationship Defoe depicts between Crusoe and Friday can also be seen in terms of cultural assimilation, with Crusoe representing the "enlightened" European whilst Friday is the "savage" who can only be redeemed from his cultural manners through assimilation into Crusoe's culture. Nonetheless, Defoe used Friday to criticize the Spanish colonization of the Americas.

According to J.P. Hunter, Robinson is not a hero but an everyman. He begins as a wanderer, aimless on a sea he does not understand, and ends as a pilgrim, crossing a final mountain to enter the promised land. The book tells the story of how Robinson becomes closer to God, not through listening to sermons in a church but through spending time alone amongst nature with only a Bible to read.

Conversely, cultural critic and literary scholar Michael Gurnow views the novel from a Rousseauian perspective: The central character's movement from a primitive state to a more civilized one is interpreted as Crusoe's denial of humanity's state of nature.

Robinson Crusoe is filled with religious aspects. Defoe was a Puritan moralist and normally worked in the guide tradition, writing books on how to be a good Puritan Christian, such as The New Family Instructor (1727) and Religious Courtship (1722). While Robinson Crusoe is far more than a guide, it shares many of the themes and theological and moral points of view.

"Crusoe" may have been taken from Timothy Cruso, a classmate of Defoe's who had written guide books, including God the Guide of Youth (1695), before dying at an early age – just eight years before Defoe wrote Robinson Crusoe. Cruso would have been remembered by contemporaries and the association with guide books is clear. It has even been speculated that God the Guide of Youth inspired Robinson Crusoe because of a number of passages in that work that are closely tied to the novel. A leitmotif of the novel is the Christian notion of providence, penitence, and redemption. Crusoe comes to repent of the follies of his youth. Defoe also foregrounds this theme by arranging highly significant events in the novel to occur on Crusoe's birthday. The denouement culminates not only in Crusoe's deliverance from the island, but his spiritual deliverance, his acceptance of Christian doctrine, and in his intuition of his own salvation.

When confronted with the cannibals, Crusoe wrestles with the problem of cultural relativism. Despite his disgust, he feels unjustified in holding the natives morally responsible for a practice so deeply ingrained in their culture. Nevertheless, he retains his belief in an absolute standard of morality; he regards cannibalism as a "national crime" and forbids Friday from practising it.

Economics and civilization 

In classical, neoclassical and Austrian economics, Crusoe is regularly used to illustrate the theory of production and choice in the absence of trade, money, and prices. Crusoe must allocate effort between production and leisure and must choose between alternative production possibilities to meet his needs. The arrival of Friday is then used to illustrate the possibility of trade and the gains that result.

The work has been variously read as an allegory for the development of civilization; as a manifesto of economic individualism; and as an expression of European colonial desires. Significantly, it also shows the importance of repentance and illustrates the strength of Defoe's religious convictions.  Critic M.E. Novak supports the connection between the religious and economic themes within Robinson Crusoe, citing Defoe's religious ideology as the influence for his portrayal of Crusoe's economic ideals, and his support of the individual. Novak cites Ian Watt's extensive research which explores the impact that several Romantic Era novels had against economic individualism, and the reversal of those ideals that takes place within Robinson Crusoe.

In Tess Lewis's review, "The heroes we deserve", of Ian Watt's article, she furthers Watt's argument with a development on Defoe's intention as an author, "to use individualism to signify nonconformity in religion and the admirable qualities of self-reliance". This further supports the belief that Defoe used aspects of spiritual autobiography to introduce the benefits of individualism to a not entirely convinced religious community. J. Paul Hunter has written extensively on the subject of Robinson Crusoe as apparent spiritual autobiography, tracing the influence of Defoe's Puritan ideology through Crusoe's narrative, and his acknowledgement of human imperfection in pursuit of meaningful spiritual engagements – the cycle of "repentance [and] deliverance."

This spiritual pattern and its episodic nature, as well as the re-discovery of earlier female novelists, have kept Robinson Crusoe from being classified as a novel, let alone the first novel written in English – despite the blurbs on some book covers. Early critics, such as Robert Louis Stevenson, admired it, saying that the footprint scene in Crusoe was one of the four greatest in English literature and most unforgettable; more prosaically, Wesley Vernon has seen the origins of forensic podiatry in this episode. It has inspired a new genre, the Robinsonade, as works such as Johann David Wyss' The Swiss Family Robinson (1812) adapt its premise and has provoked modern postcolonial responses, including J. M. Coetzee's Foe (1986) and Michel Tournier's Vendredi ou les Limbes du Pacifique (in English, Friday, or, The Other Island) (1967).  Two sequels followed: Defoe's The Farther Adventures of Robinson Crusoe (1719) and his Serious reflections during the life and surprising adventures of Robinson Crusoe: with his Vision of the angelick world (1720). Jonathan Swift's Gulliver's Travels (1726) is in part a parody of Defoe's adventure novel.

Legacy

Influence on language
The book proved to be so popular that the names of the two main protagonists, Crusoe and Friday, have entered the language. During World War II, people who decided to stay and hide in the ruins of the German-occupied city of Warsaw for a period of three winter months, from October to January 1945, when they were rescued by the Red Army, were later called Robinson Crusoes of Warsaw (Robinsonowie warszawscy). Robinson Crusoe usually referred to his servant as "my man Friday", from which the term "Man Friday" (or "Girl Friday") originated.

Influence on literature
Robinson Crusoe marked the beginning of realistic fiction as a literary genre. Its success led to many imitators, and castaway novels, written by Ambrose Evans, Penelope Aubin, and others, became quite popular in Europe in the 18th and early 19th centuries. Most of these have fallen into obscurity, but some became established, including The Swiss Family Robinson, which borrowed Crusoe's first name for its title.

Jonathan Swift's Gulliver's Travels, published seven years after Robinson Crusoe, may be read as a systematic rebuttal of Defoe's optimistic account of human capability. In The Unthinkable Swift: The Spontaneous Philosophy of a Church of England Man, Warren Montag argues that Swift was concerned about refuting the notion that the individual precedes society, as Defoe's novel seems to suggest. In Treasure Island, author Robert Louis Stevenson parodies Crusoe with the character of Ben Gunn, a friendly castaway who was marooned for many years, has a wild appearance, dresses entirely in goat skin, and constantly talks about providence.

In Jean-Jacques Rousseau's treatise on education, Emile, or on Education, the one book the protagonist is allowed to read before the age of twelve is Robinson Crusoe. Rousseau wants Emile to identify himself as Crusoe so he can rely upon himself for all of his needs. In Rousseau's view, Emile needs to imitate Crusoe's experience, allowing necessity to determine what is to be learned and accomplished. This is one of the main themes of Rousseau's educational model.

In The Tale of Little Pig Robinson, Beatrix Potter directs the reader to Robinson Crusoe for a detailed description of the island (the land of the Bong tree) to which her eponymous hero moves. In Wilkie Collins' most popular novel, The Moonstone, one of the chief characters and narrators, Gabriel Betteredge, has faith in all that Robinson Crusoe says and uses the book for a sort of divination. He considers The Adventures of Robinson Crusoe the finest book ever written, reads it over and over again, and considers a man but poorly read if he had happened not to read the book.

French novelist Michel Tournier published Friday, or, The Other Island (French Vendredi ou les Limbes du Pacifique) in 1967. His novel explores themes including civilization versus nature, the psychology of solitude, as well as death and sexuality in a retelling of Defoe's Robinson Crusoe story. Tournier's Robinson chooses to remain on the island, rejecting civilization when offered the chance to escape 28 years after being shipwrecked. Likewise, in 1963, J. M. G. Le Clézio, winner of the 2008 Nobel Prize in Literature, published the novel Le Proces-Verbal. The book's epigraph is a quote from Robinson Crusoe, and like Crusoe, the novel's protagonist Adam Pollo suffers long periods of loneliness.

"Crusoe in England", a 183 line poem by Elizabeth Bishop, imagines Crusoe near the end of his life, recalling his time of exile with a mixture of bemusement and regret.

J. M. Coetzee's 1986 novel Foe recounts the tale of Robinson Crusoe from the perspective of a woman named Susan Barton.

Other stories inspired by Robinson Crusoe include William Golding's Lord Of The Flies (1954), J. G. Ballard's Concrete Island (1974), and Andy Weir's The Martian (2011).

Comics adaptations
The story was also illustrated and published in comic book form by Classics Illustrated in 1943 and 1957. The much improved 1957 version was inked / penciled by Sam Citron, who is most well known for his contributions to the earlier issues of Superman. British illustrator Reginald Ben Davis drew a female version of the story titled Jill Crusoe, Castaway (1950–1959).

Stage adaptations
A pantomime version of Robinson Crusoe was staged at the Theatre Royal, Drury Lane in 1796, with Joseph Grimaldi as Pierrot in the harlequinade. The piece was produced again in 1798, this time starring Grimaldi as Clown. In 1815, Grimaldi played Friday in another version of Robinson Crusoe.

Jacques Offenbach wrote an opéra comique called Robinson Crusoé, which was first performed at the Opéra-Comique in Paris on 23 November 1867. This was based on the British pantomime version rather than the novel itself. The libretto was by Eugène Cormon and Hector-Jonathan Crémieux.

There have been a number of other stage adaptations, including those by Isaac Pocock, Jim Helsinger and Steve Shaw and a musical by Victor Prince.

Film adaptations
There is a 1927 silent film titled Robinson Crusoe. The Soviet 3D film Robinson Crusoe was produced in 1947.

One of the first adaptations still available dates from 1932 titled Mr. Robinson Crusoe. This film was produced by Douglas Fairbanks Sr and directed by Eddie Sutherland. Set in Tahiti, the film depicts Defoe trying to survive on a desert island for almost a year. This film was not very successful.

Luis Buñuel directed Adventures of Robinson Crusoe starring Dan O'Herlihy, released in 1954. Luis Buñuel filmed an account which at first viewing appeared to be a rather simple straightforward telling of Robinson Crusoe. A big stand out with this film is that Buñuel breaks the previous films’ traditions of having Friday as a slave and Crusoe as the master. The two manage to become actually friends and they operate essentially as equals.

Walt Disney later comedicized the novel with Lt. Robin Crusoe, U.S.N., featuring Dick Van Dyke. In this version, Friday became a beautiful woman, but named 'Wednesday' instead.

Variations on the theme include the 1954 Miss Robin Crusoe, with a female castaway, played by Amanda Blake, and a female Friday, and in 1965 we get the film adaptation Robinson Crusoe on Mars, starring Paul Mantee, with an alien Friday portrayed by Victor Lundin and an added character played by Adam West. Byron Haskins manages to underscore Crusoe's removal and field of the red planet that we call mars. Our main character meets a Friday-esque character but makes no effort to try and understand his language. Like the book, in this film, Friday is trying to escape from cruel masters. This movie has lots of appeal to fans of adventures stories and the film has a distinctive visual style that adds to its character.

Peter O'Toole and Richard Roundtree co-starred in a 1975 film Man Friday which sardonically portrayed Crusoe as incapable of seeing his dark-skinned companion as anything but an inferior creature, while Friday is more enlightened and sympathetic. In 1988, Aidan Quinn portrayed Robinson Crusoe in the film Crusoe. A 1997 movie entitled Robinson Crusoe starred Pierce Brosnan and received limited commercial success. The 2000 film Cast Away, with Tom Hanks as a FedEx employee stranded on an island for many years, also borrows much from the Robinson Crusoe story.

In 1981, Czechoslovakian director and animator Stanislav Látal made a version of the story under the name Adventures of Robinson Crusoe, a Sailor from York combining traditional and stop-motion animation. The movie was coproduced by regional West Germany broadcaster Südwestfunk Baden-Baden.

Animated adaptations
In 1988, an animated cartoon for children called Classic Adventure Stories Robinson Crusoe was released. Crusoe's early sea travels are simplified, as his ship outruns the Salé Rovers pirates but then gets wrecked in a storm.

Radio adaptations 
Daniel Defoe - Robinson Crusoe was adapted as a two part play for BBC radio. Dramatised by Steve Chambers and Directed by Marion Nancarrow it was first broadcast on BBC Radio 4 in May 1998. Subsequently re-broadcast on BBC Radio 4 Extra in February 2023.

Starring Roy Marsden and Tom Bevan.

TV adaptations
In 1964, a French film production crew made a 13 part serial of The Adventures of Robinson Crusoe. It starred Robert Hoffmann. The black and white series was dubbed into English and German. In the UK, the BBC broadcast it on numerous occasions between 1965 and 1977.

Two 2000s reality television series, Expedition Robinson and Survivor, have their contestants try to survive on an isolated location, usually an island. The concept is influenced by Robinson Crusoe.

Inverted Crusoeism 
The term inverted Crusoeism is coined by J. G. Ballard. The paradigm of Robinson Crusoe has been a recurring topic in Ballard's work. Whereas the original Robinson Crusoe became a castaway against his own will, Ballard's protagonists often choose to maroon themselves; hence inverted Crusoeism (e.g., Concrete Island). The concept provides a reason as to why people would deliberately maroon themselves on a remote island; in Ballard's work, becoming a castaway is as much a healing and empowering process as an entrapping one, enabling people to discover a more meaningful and vital existence.

Editions
 The life and strange surprizing adventures of Robinson Crusoe: of York, mariner: who lived twenty eight years all alone in an un-inhabited island on the coast of America, near the mouth of the great river of Oroonoque; ... Written by himself., Early English Books Online, 1719. 
 Robinson Crusoe, Oneworld Classics 2008. 
 Robinson Crusoe, Penguin Classics 2003. 
 Robinson Crusoe, Oxford World's Classics 2007. 
 Robinson Crusoe, Bantam Classics
 Defoe, Daniel Robinson Crusoe, edited by Michael Shinagel (New York: Norton, 1994), . Includes a selection of critical essays.
 Defoe, Daniel. Robinson Crusoe. Dover Publications, 1998.
 Life and Adventures of Robinson Crusoe Rand McNally & Company. The Windermere Series 1916. No ISBN. Includes 7 illustrations by Milo Winter

See also

From real life
 Leendert Hasenbosch
 Philip Ashton
 Crusoe Cave
 Alexander Selkirk
 Naso people

From television and films
 Cast Away
 Gilligan's Island
 Swiss Family Robinson
 Lost in Space
 Crusoe
 Selkirk, the Real Robinson Crusoe
 Robinson Crusoe (2016 film)

Novels
Green Grass, Running Water

Stage adaptations
 Isaac Pocock (1782–1835)

Footnotes

References

Additional references
 
 
 Malabou, Catherine. “To Quarantine from Quarantine: Rousseau, Robinson Crusoe, and ‘I.’” Critical Inquiry, vol. 47, no. S2, 2021, https://doi.org/10.1086/711426.
 
 Ross, Angus, ed. (1965), Robinson Crusoe. Penguin.
 Secord, Arthur Wellesley (1963). Studies in the Narrative Method of Defoe. New York: Russell & Russell. (First published in 1924.)
 Shinagel, Michael, ed. (1994). Robinson Crusoe. Norton Critical Edition. . Includes textual annotations, contemporary and modern criticisms, bibliography.
 Severin, Tim (2002). In search of Robinson Crusoe, New York: Basic Books. 
 
 Shinagel, Michael, ed. (1994), Robinson Crusoe. Norton Critical Edition. By Kogul, Mariapan.

Literary criticism
 Backscheider, Paula Daniel Defoe: His Life (Baltimore: Johns Hopkins University Press, 1989). .
 Ewers, Chris Mobility in the English Novel from Defoe to Austen. (Woodbridge: Boydell and Brewer, 2018). . Includes a chapter on Robinson Crusoe.
 Richetti, John (ed.) The Cambridge Companion to Daniel Defoe. (Cambridge: Cambridge University Press, 2009) . Casebook of critical essays.
 Rogers, Pat Robinson Crusoe (London: Allen and Unwin, 1979). .
 Watt, Ian The Rise of the Novel (London: Pimlico, 2000). .

External links

 
 Robinson Crusoe at Editions Marteau (annotated text of the first edition) 
 
 Robinson Crusoe in Words of One Syllable by Mary Godolphin (1723–1764), hosted at Project Gutenberg
 "Robinson Crusoe & the Robinsonades", a free online collection of editions of Robinson Crusoe from the Baldwin Library of Historical Children's Literature

Robinson Crusoe
1719 novels
18th-century British novels
Crusoe, Robinson
British novels adapted into films
British novels adapted into plays
Novels about cannibalism
Caribbean in fiction
Crusoe, Robinson
English adventure novels
Crusoe, Robinson
Crusoe, Robinson
Crusoe, Robinson
Crusoe, Robinson
Novels about survival skills
Novels adapted into comics
Novels adapted into radio programs
British novels adapted into television shows
Novels by Daniel Defoe
Novels set in the 1650s
Novels set in the 1660s
Novels set in the 1670s
Novels set in the 1680s
Novels set in Brazil
Novels set in Venezuela
Novels set on fictional islands
Novels about pirates
Novels set on uninhabited islands
Crusoe, Robinson